Trent Lawford (born 18 April 1988) is an Australian cricketer. He has played for South Australia in the Sheffield Shield and in Australian domestic limited-overs cricket; as well as the Adelaide Strikers, Sydney Sixers and Melbourne Renegades in the Big Bash League and Northern Districts in the Super Smash in New Zealand.

Lawford made his first-class cricket debut for South Australia against Western Australia in November 2013.

He won the Jack Ryder Medal in Victorian Premier cricket for the 2017–18 season.

References

1988 births
Living people
Australian cricketers
South Australia cricketers
Cricketers from Melbourne
Adelaide Strikers cricketers
Sydney Sixers cricketers
Melbourne Renegades cricketers
Northern Districts cricketers